is a Japanese actor from Koto, Tokyo. He is known for his protagonist roles in Himizu and Parasyte.

Career

Sometani was a child actor. He has worked in both film and television, gaining his first leading role in Pandora's Box, a 2009 film adaptation of an Osamu Dazai novel.

In 2011, he received the Marcello Mastroianni Award for Best New Young Actor at the Venice Film Festival for his work in Himizu along with his co-star Fumi Nikaidō.

He appeared in Shinji Aoyama's 2011 film Tokyo Park, Koji Wakamatsu's 2012 film The Millennial Rapture, and starred in Gakuryu Ishii's 2012 film Isn't Anyone Alive?

Personal life 

Sometani married actress Rinko Kikuchi on December 31, 2014. In October 2016, Kikuchi gave birth to their first child. Their second child was born in late 2018.

Filmography

Film

Animated films

Television drama

Other television

Awards

References

External links

 Shota Sometani's profile 
 Official Blog 
 

1992 births
Living people
Japanese male film actors
Japanese male child actors
Male actors from Tokyo
Marcello Mastroianni Award winners
People from Kōtō